The Mancos High School, at 350 Grand Ave. in Mancos, Colorado, was built in 1909.

It was listed on the National Register of Historic Places in 1991.

It is built of sandstone blocks cut by local people.  It was expanded and renovated in 1954 at cost of $140,000. A second major renovation was completed in 2020.

References

		

National Register of Historic Places in Montezuma County, Colorado
School buildings on the National Register of Historic Places in Colorado
Colonial Revival architecture in Colorado
School buildings completed in 1909
High schools in Colorado
1909 establishments in Colorado